The Levasseur PL.11 was an observation seaplane built by Levasseur in the early 1930s. It was a biplane of mixed wood and metal construction with floats for operating from water.

Specifications

References

PL.11
1930s French military reconnaissance aircraft
Aircraft first flown in 1931